The Democratic Movement (Tnu'a Demokratit) was a short-lived political party in Israel formed in the aftermath of the spectacular breakup of Dash. Founded in 1978, it lasted only until 1981.

Background
The party was formed on 14 September 1978 when Dash split into three new parties just sixteen months after having come third in the 1977 elections. Seven MKs, including Dash leader Yigael Yadin, founded the Democratic Movement, seven created Shinui (Change) and one set up Ya'ad.

Unlike Shinui, which pulled out, the new party remained part of Menachem Begin's coalition government, with Yadin as deputy Prime Minister and Shmuel Tamir as Minister of Justice.

However, like its predecessor, the Democratic Movement also broke up. In 1980 four MKs left the party; Mordechai Elgrably left on 5 February to sit as an independent MK (he later helped form the Unity Party), on 8 July Shafik Asaad and Shlomo Eliyahu left to form Ahva (which also split before the next elections), whilst Akiva Nof left on 17 September, also to join Ahva. The party was officially dissolved on 10 March 1981, with its remaining members, Tamir, Yadin and Binyamin Halevi, sitting out the remainder of the Knesset session as independents.

List of Knesset members

External links
Party history Knesset website

Defunct political parties in Israel
Political parties established in 1978
Political parties disestablished in 1981
Liberal parties in Israel
Zionist political parties in Israel